An alumni association or alumnae association  is an association of graduates or, more broadly, of former students (alumni). In the United Kingdom and the United States, alumni of universities, colleges, schools (especially independent schools), fraternities, and sororities often form groups with alumni from the same organization.  These associations often organize social events, publish newsletters or magazines, and raise funds for the organization. Many provide a variety of benefits and services that help alumni maintain connections to their educational institution and fellow graduates. In the US, most associations do not require its members to be an alumnus of a university to enjoy membership and privileges.

Additionally, such groups often support new alumni, and provide a forum to form new friendships and business relationships with people of similar background.

Alumni associations are mainly organized around universities or departments of universities, but may also be organized among students that studied in a certain country. In the past, they were often considered to be the university's or school's old boy society (or Old boy network). Today, alumni associations involve graduates of all age groups and demographics.

Alumni associations are often organized into chapters by city, region, or country.

Corporate alumni
The term alumni association has been expanded in recent years to also refer to former employees of business organizations who are using the association to drive greater recruitment, sales and business opportunities with their former staff. The conversation was first highlighted by Reid Hoffman, founder of LinkedIn in his book The Alliance.

Notable vendors within the Corporate Alumni space include Salesforce, Oracle, EnterpriseAlumni & Avature

References

 
Types of organization